Michael Genovese (born 1976, Chicago) is a Los Angeles-based multi-disciplinary artist.

Selected exhibitions 
2016 Michael Genovese, "Intervals," Moran Bondaroff, Los Angeles, CA.
2013 Michael Genovese, Lines and Cracks and Zebras and Horses, OHWOW, Los Angeles, CA.
2013 Michael Genovese, Joliet, Paris London Hong Kong, Chicago, IL 
2012 Michael Genovese, P.S./P.P.S., Frost Art Museum, Miami, FL 
2012 Write Now, Chicago Cultural Center, Chicago, IL
2011 Materialism, OHWOW, Miami, FL 
2011 Between Here and There: Modern and Contemporary Art from the Permanent Collection, Miami Art Museum, Miami, FL
2011 The South Florida Cultural Consortium Fellowship Exhibition, Frost Art Museum, Miami, FL 
2010 The Island, Los Angeles Nomadic Division (LAND) and OHWOW, Miami Beach, FL 
2010 New Work Miami 2010, Miami Art Museum, Miami, FL 
2010 Writ Deep, Northern Illinois University School of Art, Dekalb, IL 
2009 Michael Genovese, It's Not the Heat, it's the Humility, OHWOW, Miami, FL 
2008 Michael Genovese, Institutionalized, Museum of Contemporary Art, Chicago, Chicago, IL (solo exhibition/residency)
2008 Michael Genovese, Contemplation Station, Department of Cultural Affairs, Chicago Cultural Center, Chicago, IL (solo exhibition/residency) 
2008 Michael Genovese, "We all we got", Packer Schopf, Chicago, IL
2008 Michael Genovese, "Just 'cause it's legal, doesn't make it right", Jack the Pelican Presents, Brooklyn, NY
2008 Sign Language, University of Texas at San Antonio and Unit B, San Antonio, TX (two person exhibition)

Residencies 
2011–12 New World School of the Arts, Miami, FL (visiting artist)
2011–12 Frost Art Museum and Florida International University, Miami, FL (visiting artist)
2010 Northern Illinois University School of Art, DeKalb, IL (artist in residence)
2010 South Florida Cultural Consortium Fellowship (Miami-Dade) 
2008 Museum of Contemporary Art, Chicago, Chicago, IL (artist in residence) 
2008 Pedway at the Chicago Cultural Center, Chicago Department of Cultural Affairs, Chicago, IL (artist in residence)
2007 Co-Habitat, Monterrey, MX (artist in residence)
2005 Danish Arts Council, Copenhagen, DK (visiting artist)

References

External links
Official Website
Michael Genovese at Moran Bondaroff

American contemporary artists
Living people
1976 births